Buy Me Up TV is a BBC Radio 2 sitcom set behind the scenes of a 24-hour shopping channel. It was written by James Eldred and Justin Edwards. A pilot episode was broadcasr in March 2007, with a further four episodes following in March 2008. It starred Justin Edwards, Katherine Jakeways, Alex MacQueen, Greg Proops, Ewen MacIntosh and Colin Hoult.

Cast
 Justin Edwards as Bob Norton
 Katherine Jakeways as Angela Bassett
 Alex MacQueen as Giles
 Greg Proops as Jacky Tanner
 Ewen MacIntosh as Ewen
 Colin Hoult as Various

Plot
Set in the studios of 24-hour shopping channel Buy Me Up TV, the programme covers the lives of the unhinged personalities selling all kinds of products in the badly run television station.

Episodes

Pilot

Series one

Reception
The show was not well received by the press, but was praised by many listeners to the show.

Broadcast history
Originally broadcast Radio 2, the series has often been repeated on BBC Radio 4 Extra.

References

BBC Radio 2 programmes
BBC Radio comedy programmes
2007 radio programme debuts